When I Took That Train is the 40th release by avant-folk/blues singer/songwriter Jandek, and the first of four released in 2005 by his own Corwood Industries label, as #0778.

The cover photo depicts the Corwood Representative standing on a street in central London – behind him can be seen Mansion House and, further back, the entrance to Bank Underground station.

Track listing

References 

2005 albums
Jandek albums
Corwood Industries albums